This page documents the tornadoes and tornado outbreaks of 1999, primarily (but not entirely) in the United States. Most tornadoes form in the U.S., although some events may take place internationally, particularly in parts of neighboring southern Canada during the Northern Hemisphere's summer season, as well as Europe.

Statistics

United States

During 1999, a total of 1,339 tornadoes touched down across the United States, ranking it as the eighth-most active year since reliable records began to be kept in 1950; at the time, 1999 was the fourth-most active year on record. The year began with the most active January on record, featuring 216 tornadoes. Culminating with the largest outbreak in the month, with over 100 tornadoes touching down on January 21 and 22 (surpassing the previous daily record of 39 on January 10, 1975), many records were broken. Due in large part to this outbreak, Arkansas saw more tornadoes in 1999 than any other year, with 107 recorded, and its most active January. The state also broke the record for most tornadoes in January of any state.

Europe
The European Severe Storms Laboratory maintains a database of all severe weather events across the continent. The vast majority of tornadoes go unrated due to a lack of surveys; however, some nations, such as France, provide detailed reports on these events. Of the 87 reported tornadoes during 1999, 45 were rated.

January
Exceptional tornado activity took place across the United States in January, with 216 tornadoes touching down, more than ten times the average of 20. This set the record for most tornadoes recorded in the month, and more than quadrupled the previous record of 52 set in 1975. The extreme activity during the month was attributed to an unusually spring-like setup, with a warm, moist air mass from the Gulf of Mexico flowing northward into an area with strong upper-level westerlies. The synoptic set up of these factors was typical of March or April rather than mid-winter. January 1999 was the most active month for tornado activity in meteorological winter until it was later surpassed by December 2021, which had a total of 227 tornadoes in a similarly hyperactive month.

January 1–3

On January 1, a strong upper-level low moved over Southeast Texas, while an accompanying surface low formed over North Texas. A cold front extended southward from this surface low into the Gulf of Mexico. Ahead of this front, a strong low level jet formed, bringing a surge of warm, moist air from the Gulf northward. The combination of these factors resulted in an unstable environment favoring the development of rotating supercell thunderstorms. The sole fatality of the outbreak was from an F2 in East Texas.

January 17–18

This was the second of three major tornado outbreaks in January 1999. Two strong to violent tornadoes hit the Jackson, Tennessee areas. Eight people were killed in the outbreaks.

January 18 (South Africa)
On January 18, a violent F4 tornado struck Mount Ayliff and Tabankulu in Eastern Cape, South Africa. The majority of the towns were destroyed, with 95 percent of residents left homeless. Numerous vehicles were lofted significant distances by the storm, with one traveling . This was the deadliest tornado on record in South Africa. 25 people were killed and approximately 500 others were injured.

January 21–23

January 21 saw 87 tornadoes touch down, making it the most active tornado day ever recorded in that month. In all, 128 tornadoes touched down and 9 people were killed.

February
There were 22 tornadoes confirmed in the US in the month of February.

February 13
One person was killed and another was injured when a tornado struck Serik, Turkey.

March
There were 56 tornadoes confirmed in the US in the month of March.

April
There were 177 tornadoes confirmed in the US in the month of April.

April 2–3

A series of tornado touchdowns struck from Kansas to Louisiana at the beginning of April. The most powerful tornado occurred in Caddo Parish and Bossier Parish in northwestern Louisiana where an F4 tornado killed 7 people and injured 107 others. The final outbreak tally was 17 tornadoes.

April 8–9

A widespread tornado outbreak affected the United States in early April 1999. It is best known for producing an F4 that killed four people in the Blue Ash and Montgomery, Ohio, areas.

May
There were 310 confirmed tornadoes in the US in the month of May.

May 2–8

A massive tornado outbreak first struck the Southern Plains on May 2–4. The worst tornado was an extremely violent F5 tornado that tore through the Southern Oklahoma City metro area, killing 36. It produced a wind gust of 301 mph, the highest winds ever recorded on Earth. The outbreak then produced at least seven tornadoes in Tennessee on May 5.
One F4 tornado struck Linden in Perry County, killing three people, while an F2 tornado struck Gallatin in Sumner County injuring 17.

May 9 (Cuba)
The town of Cruces in Cuba sustained major damage from a violent tornado. Hundreds of brick, block and tile homes were completely destroyed, with 40 being destroyed and 224 others sustaining damage. Other damage included eight five-ton water tanks being thrown. This tornado was originally rated F4 on the Fujita scale, however, in 2023, it was rated EF4 on the Enhanced Fujita scale by the University of Havana.

May 9–12

A slow-moving cold front produced several days of severe weather and tornadoes across the Central U.S. From May 9 to 10, mostly weak tornadoes touched down from South Dakota to Texas. The most notable tornadoes occurred on May 11 as multiple supercells developed along the cold front in Oklahoma and Texas. Shortly after 6:00 p.m. In one of the homes, six people sought refuge in a car within their garage; debris fell on the car, killing one and injuring the other five. A large section of asphalt was ripped out by the tornado as well. A few hours later, an F3 tornado touched down in Gillespie County, Texas. Damage from the storm reached $1 million. On May 12, activity was again limited to a few weak tornadoes.

May 15–17

On May 15, some tornadoes were reported including one near Stockton, Kansas.

The next day, several tornadoes touched down in Iowa. Two F3 tornadoes struck Harrison County, one of which struck a bus, killing two people on board and injuring several others.

May 15 (China)
On May 15, a tornado struck rural areas of Suixi County, Guangdong, China, killing 13 people and causing extensive damage. The majority of damage occurred in Qinge Village. Nine people were killed in the town while four others later died of their injuries. A total of 178 homes were destroyed while 489 more were damaged. An additional 51 people were injured, 35 seriously, and damage was estimated at $414 million.

May 30–June 1

An outbreak produced 59 tornadoes across the Great Plains. On May 31, two significant tornadoes, rated F2 and F3, struck Lincoln County, Colorado, while a photogenic tornado formed over Sitka, Kansas. More intense tornadic activity occurred on June 1. An F3 tornado killed two people in Fort Gibson, Oklahoma, while another person was killed by an F3 tornado in Zanesville, Illinois.

June
There were 289 tornadoes confirmed in the US in the month of June.

June 3–5

Tornadoes touched down across portions of the Great Plains on June 3. Two F3 tornadoes struck near Almena, Kansas and Elyria, Nebraska, while two F2 tornadoes struck near Comstock, Nebraska and southeast of Steele, North Dakota. More tornadoes, mostly rated F0, touched down on June 4, concentrating in two clusters; one in South Dakota and Nebraska and the other in Illinois. However, an F2 tornado did strike Oglala, South Dakota, killing one person. On June 5, a high risk for severe weather was issued for parts of South Dakota and Nebraska by the Storm Prediction Center as another violent tornado outbreak was expected. 21 tornadoes did touchdown that day, but they were all weak.

June 4 (Italy)
A supercell produced a tornado around San Quirino, Italy, causing damage to houses, sheds, and trees along a path width of about 300 m and length of less than 10 km.

June 6

An F4 tornado hit areas in and around Mountain, North Dakota. One farmhouse was completely lifted up and tossed , a combine was also picked up and thrown several hundred feet, and a swather was picked up and wrapped around several trees. In town, numerous trees were knocked down, two mobile homes were destroyed, a house was unroofed, and a garage was destroyed. Other tornadoes also touched down that day across the Central United States, but the majority of them were short-lived and weak. There were no injuries or fatalities.

July
There were 102 tornadoes confirmed in the US in the month of July.

August
There were 79 tornadoes confirmed in the US in the month of August.

August 8 
On August 8, Severe thunderstorms in Suffolk County, New York produced an F2 tornado which traveled from northern Mattituck, to Cutchogue. The tornado injured one person and caused $1 million dollars in damage.

August 11–13

On August 11, a cold upper-level trough moved into Utah. By the afternoon, a frontal boundary or convergence zone developed over the state. With sufficient wind shear and instability, thunderstorms that developed along this boundary became severe. Touching down at 12:41 p.m. The F2 tornado damaged or destroyed 300 structures, including the Delta Center and the city's capitol building. Overall, one person was killed, 80 were injured, and losses amounted to $170 million, making it the most destructive tornado in the state's history. Four weaker tornadoes touched down across South Dakota and Wyoming on August 12. The following two days featured seven additional tornadoes, none of which exceeded F1 intensity. Alongside the tornadoes, straight-line winds caused extensive damage in many states from August 11–13. These winds resulted in one fatality and $56.9 million in damage, the majority coming from crop damage.

August 14–15

On August 14, two tornadoes hit the small town of Lewistown, Montana. The first tornado, an F2, was on the ground for less than a mile. The second tornado's path is unknown. Reports said 150 homes were damaged, and hail affected almost everyone in the town. There were no fatalities and only one minor injury.

August 29 (South Africa)

An F1 tornado struck Cape Flats, South Africa. At least four people were killed, while a fifth died from a heart attack, and 220 were injured. Approximately 5,000 people were left homeless.

September
There were 56 tornadoes confirmed in the US in the month of September.

September 15

As Hurricane Floyd neared landfall in North Carolina, its outer bands spawned 17 tornadoes across the state. The majority were weak, though two produced F2 damage.

September 24 (Japan) 
A tornado struck the city of Toyohashi, Aichi, Japan, destroying three homes and damaging many others. A total of 262 people sustained minor injuries, mainly school children, from shattered glass.

October
There were 17 tornadoes confirmed in the United States in the month of October.

October 13
A squall line originating in Illinois produced an F3 tornado in Pickaway County, Ohio, that destroyed several homes and injured six people. The storm was responsible for $4 million in damage.

October 15

As Hurricane Irene neared landfall in Florida, it spawned four weak tornadoes across the state.

October 21 (South Africa)

Lasting about an hour and a half, the storm produced two tornadoes, rated F3 and F1, along its path. The tornado mostly remained over open areas, though significant damage occurred in Heidelberg, Gauteng. There, 40 people sustained injuries and 400 structures were damaged. At an unknown point along the path, the tornado sucked up nearly all the water in a large shallow dam and deposited it on nearby hills.

November
There were 7 tornadoes confirmed in the United States in November.

November 26
A cold front moved into an unseasonably warm air mass over Pennsylvania, resulting in the formation of a tornado in Chester County. Rated high-end F1, the tornado destroyed 6 structures and damaged 26 more, leaving $3 million in losses; 12 people were injured.

December
There were 15 tornadoes confirmed in the United States in December.

December 2–4
Almost all of the tornadoes in December touched down between December 2 and 4.

December 9
An isolated F3 tornado touched down in Yazoo County, Mississippi, destroying two mobile homes and downing thousands of trees.

See also
 Tornado
 Tornadoes by year
 Tornado records
 Tornado climatology
 Tornado myths
 List of tornado outbreaks
 List of F5 and EF5 tornadoes
 List of North American tornadoes and tornado outbreaks
 List of 21st-century Canadian tornadoes and tornado outbreaks
 List of European tornadoes and tornado outbreaks
 List of tornadoes and tornado outbreaks in Asia
 List of Southern Hemisphere tornadoes and tornado outbreaks
 List of tornadoes striking downtown areas
 Tornado intensity
 Fujita scale
 Enhanced Fujita scale

References

External links

 U.S. tornadoes in 1999 – Tornado History Project
 Storm Data "1999 Annual Summaries" (NCDC)
 Tornado Project: US Killer Tornadoes of 1999

 
Tornado-related lists by year
Torn
1999 meteorology